Jose Antonio Salera Veloso (born June 13, 1960), is a Filipino politician and vice mayor of Tagbilaran City, Bohol, Philippines. His nickname is "Toto". He was named after San Antonio de Padua whose feast day also falls on his birthday.

Early life and education

Political career

He was elected councilor in 2001 and re-elected in 2004 as the No. 1 councilor.  He ran and was elected vice mayor in 2007.

In 2010, he ran as a mayoralty candidate but lost to former mayor of Tagbilaran attorney Dan Lim.

In 2013, he was re-elected as vice mayor of Tagbilaran.

Sources
 City Government of Tagbilaran website
 The Sangguniang Panlungsod of Tagbilaran website
 Governmental website for Tagbilaran

Living people
People from Tagbilaran
Politicians from Bohol
Filipino city and municipal councilors
1960 births